KSRZ (104.5 FM, "Star 104.5") is a radio station broadcasting an adult contemporary format. Licensed to Omaha, Nebraska, United States, the station serves the Omaha-Lincoln-Council Bluffs Metropolitan area.  The station is owned by SummitMedia. KSRZ's studios are located on Mercy Road in Omaha's Aksarben Village, while its transmitter is located at the Omaha master antenna farm at North 72nd Street and Crown Point.

History

Country (1972-1979) 
The station signed on the air in 1972 as KOOO-FM, a country music station.

Beautiful music (1979-1989) 
In 1979, the station changed their call letters to KESY and flipped to an automated beautiful music format. Throughout the early 1980s, KESY was used on a local Limelight Movie Channel when it signed off the air for the night.

Soft adult contemporary (1989-1998) 
By 1989, KESY evolved its format to soft adult contemporary, adopted the moniker "Y 104", and used live DJs once again.

Adult contemporary (1998-present) 
On January 9, 1998, KESY moved to the 97.7 FM frequency. After a few days of simulcasting, 104.5 FM flipped to modern adult contemporary (which emphasizes on more modern rock hits targeting a female audience) as "Star 104.5", with new call letters KSRZ. The format would later evolve to a more broad-based Hot AC.

By 2008, KSRZ evolved into a mainstream adult contemporary format, with a heavy reliance on songs from the 1980s.

Journal Communications and the E. W. Scripps Company announced on July 30, 2014 that the two companies would merge to create a new broadcast company under the E. W. Scripps Company name that owned the two companies' broadcast properties, including KSRZ. The transaction was completed in 2015. Scripps exited radio in 2018; the Omaha stations went to SummitMedia in a four-market, $47 million deal completed on November 1, 2018.

References

External links

SRZ
Mainstream adult contemporary radio stations in the United States
Radio stations established in 1972
1972 establishments in Nebraska